Edward George "Moxie" Divis (January 16, 1894 – December 19, 1955) was an American Major League Baseball outfielder. He played for the Philadelphia Athletics during the  season.

References

Major League Baseball outfielders
Philadelphia Athletics players
Baseball players from Cleveland
1894 births
1955 deaths